Richard Devlin may refer to:

 Richard Devlin (legal scholar) (born 1960), Canadian law professor
 Richard Devlin (politician) (born 1952), Oregon state senator